Freedom is the 13th studio album by singer-songwriter Sheena Easton released only in Japan where it charted at #53.

The album consists of smooth, catchy dance-pop songs including the singles "Modern Girl '97," "Love Me With Freedom," and "When You Speak My Name." 
Easton had co-writing credits on songs "One Man" and "Love Will Make You Wise" and producing credits on 3 tracks. The album also includes cover versions of the country/R&B classic Misty Blue, best known by Dorothy Moore's 1973 soul version, and Steve Perry's 1985 rock hit Foolish Heart.

Easton released Freedom on her own label (SkyJay Trax) on May 28, 1997 at the same time she officially opened her website. In February 2007 Fuel Records (Varèse Sarabande) re-released Freedom with a slip cover and different artwork in (Limited Edition) officially in the United States.

Track listings
"When You Speak My Name" (Antonina Armato, Benny Cosgrove, Kevin Clark) - 4:26 
"Love Me With Freedom" (Antonina Armato, Greg Gerard) - 4:25
"Now That My Baby's Gone" (Alex Alessandroni, Gloria Stewart, Lorenzo Pryor, Sue Ann Carwell) - 4:30
"One Man" (Carole Bayer Sager, Clif Magness, Sheena Easton) - 4:38 
"Misty Blue" (Bob Montgomery) - 4:39
"One More Reason" (Antonina Armato, Tom Keene) - 4:25
"Let Me Go Through This Alone" (Andy Goldmark, Mark Mueller) - 4:04
"Love Will Make You Wise" (Clif Magness, Sheena Easton) - 4:11
"Foolish Heart" (Randy Goodrum, Steve Perry) - 4:54 
"Modern Girl '97" (Dominic Bugatti, Frank Musker) - 4:13

Production and personnel
Arranged by, programmed By  
Claude Gaudette (track: 6)
Clif Magness (tracks: 2 to 4, 8, 10) 
Danny Jacob (tracks: 5, 9)
Randy Waldman (track: 1) 
Backing vocals – Lynn Davis (track: 10), Maxi Anderson (track: 10), Sheena Easton (tracks: 4, 5, 9, 10), Sue Ann Carwell (tracks: 1 to 3, 6, 7) 
Engineer – Elliot Scheiner (track: 10), Humberto Gatica (track: 6), Jess Sutcliffe (tracks: 1 to 5, 7 to 9), Randy Waldman (track: 1) 
Guitar – Danny Jacob (tracks: 1, 5) 
Mixed by Humberto Gatica (tracks: 4, 6), Jess Sutcliffe (tracks: 1, 3, 5, 7 to 9), Jim "Bonzai" Caruso (track: 2) 
Producer – Andy Goldman (track: 7), Clif Magness (tracks: 2 to 4, 8, 10), Danny Jacob (tracks: 5, 9), Denny Diante (tracks: 1 to 4, 6, 7, 10), Humberto Gatica (track: 6), Randy Waldman (tracks: 1), Sheena Easton (tracks: 5, 8, 9)

References
[ Freedom] at AllMusic

1997 albums
Sheena Easton albums
Albums produced by Humberto Gatica
MCA Records albums